The 2016–17 Liga Gimel season was the 49th season of fifth tier football in Israel, with 102 clubs competing in 8 regional divisions for promotion to Liga Bet.

Review and events
 Towards the end of the season the minor leagues referees went on strike. As consequence, some matches were not played, while others were played with replacement referees or with partial staff. The IFA set the unplayed matches as 0–0 with no points awarded.

Upper Galilee Division

 Two matches were not played and were given as a 0–0 without points: Hapoel Bnei Tuba-Zangariyye – Maccabi Ahva Yarka and Bnei Bi'ina – Maccabi Ahva Sha'ab.

Lower Galilee Division

Jezreel Division

Samaria Division

 Two matches weren't played and were given as a 0–0 without points: Hapoel Ahva Haifa – Maccabi Ironi Barta'a and Hapoel Menashe – F.C. Pardes Hanna-Karkur.

Sharon Division

 Four matches weren't played and were given as a 0–0 without points: Maccabi HaSharon Netanya – Bnei Qalansawe, Hapoel Oranit – Hapoel Kafr Bara, Hapoel Jaljulia – F.C. Netanya and F.C. Kafr Qasim Nibrass – Tzeirei Tira.

Tel Aviv Division

 Five matches weren't played and were given as a 0–0 without points: Sporting Club – Maccabi Or Yehuda, Inter Aliyah – Bnei Yehud, Beitar Jaffa – Beitar Ezra, Elitzur Yehud – Ozmah Holon and Hapoel Neve Golan – Beitar Jaffa.

Central Division

 Five matches weren't played and were given as a 0–0 without points: Hapoel Tirat Shalom – Tzeirei Lod, Hapoel Matliah – F.C. Rishon LeZion, Ironi Lod – Maccabi Rehovot, Beitar Ashdod – Hapoel Bnei Ashdod and Hapoel Mevaseret Zion – Hapoel Ramla

South Division

 Five matches weren't played and were given as a 0–0 without points: Tzeirei al-Hoshla – Hapoel Ar'arat an-Naqab, Hapoel Ar'arat an-Naqab – Maccabi Dimona, Ironi Kuseife – Hapoel Rahat, Beitar Kiryat Gat – A.S. Ashkelon and Hapoel Merhavi – Maccabi Ironi Hura

References

External links
Liga Gimel Upper Galilee The Israel Football Association 
Liga Gimel Lower Galilee The Israel Football Association 
Liga Gimel Jezreel The Israel Football Association 
Liga Gimel Samaria The Israel Football Association 
Liga Gimel Sharon The Israel Football Association 
Liga Gimel Tel Aviv The Israel Football Association 
Liga Gimel Central The Israel Football Association 
Liga Gimel South The Israel Football Association 

5
Liga Gimel seasons
Israel Liga Gimel